PotlatchDeltic Corporation (originally Potlatch Corp) is an American diversified forest products company based in Spokane, Washington.

It manufactures and sells lumber, panels and particleboard and receives revenue from other assets such as mineral rights and the leasing of land as well as the sale of land considered expendable. In February 2018, Potlatch acquired Deltic Timber Corp., a smaller Arkansas-based timber company. Following the merger, the company was renamed PotlatchDeltic Corporation. In 2021, the company harvested 5,515,000 tons of lumber.

History

Origins 

The Potlatch Lumber Company was incorporated in 1903 with authorized capital of $3.0 million by a consortium of lumber investors, including William Deary of Northland Pine Company,  Henry Turrish of Wisconsin Log and Lumber, and Frederick Weyerhaeuser, who was also an investor in Deary's Northland Pine business. Frederick Weyerhaeuser's son Charles A. Weyerhaeuser became the company's first President and held that role until his death in 1930, while Deary was named the company's General Manager. Potlatch planned a lumber mill on the Palouse River and began construction in 1905, completing it in 1906.

The company town of Potlatch, Idaho was built to serve the mill. Over 200 buildings were designed by architect C. Ferris White for the firm. The town soon became the second biggest town in Latah County, Idaho, and the firm was the biggest taxpayer in Idaho for some years. The Commercial Historic District (Potlatch, Idaho), which includes the main administrative building of the company, was listed on the National Register of Historic Places in 1986. William Deary also oversaw the building of a logging railroad connecting the mill to the Chicago, Milwaukee, St. Paul and Pacific Railroad. The town of Deary, Idaho was named after him.

In 1931, the company became Potlatch Forests, Inc. (PFI) after acquiring the operations of neighboring Clearwater Timber and Edward Rutledge Timber companies, which were facing financial difficulties as a result of lumber oversupply during the Great Depression. After the acquisitions, the company operated the original Potlatch mill as well as a sawmill in Elk River, Idaho (opened by Potlatch in 1907), the Clearwater sawmill in Lewiston, Idaho (opened in 1927), and the Rutledge sawmill in Coeur d'Alene, Idaho (opened in 1916).

Sustainable Forest Management 

John Philip (Phil) Weyerhaeuser, Jr., nephew of Charles A. Weyerhaeuser, became President of PFI in 1931. Previously, as General Manager of Clearwater Timber, he began the first program of sustainable forest management for timber as a crop in the United States. PFI continued this program and Phil Weyerhaeuser implemented it on a larger scale when he joined the family Weyerhaeuser Timber Company in 1933.

After Phil Weyerhaeuser's departure, C.L. Billings took over as PFI's General Manager. During his tenure, which lasted until 1949, PFI continued to develop and practice sustained yield forest management in the Inland Northwest. Starting in 1940, PFI started paying out dividends.

Modern Day 

The Potlatch mill operated until 1981 and the company announced that mill closure would be permanent in 1983. In 1985, Canadian businessman Samuel Belzberg's First City Financial Corporation attempted a takeover of the company. Potlatch eventually bought back the corporation's 1.1 million shares, paying $8.1 million and ending the takeover bid. With the buyback, the stock returned to the control of the Weyerhaeuser family, the descendants of the original founder.

In March 2002, Potlatch sold its Cloquet, Minnesota, pulp and printing papers facilities and associated assets to Sappi Limited for US$480 million. This sale marked its exit from the coated printing papers business. Sappi closed the facilities and moved the production to its own plants in Skowhegan, Maine, and Westbrook, Maine.

In 2006, Potlatch restructured to form a real estate investment trust (REIT).  In this restructuring all of the company's manufacturing operations are held by a wholly owned subsidiary, allowing the company to refocus on managing their large land holdings in Oregon, Idaho, Minnesota, and Arkansas.

In February 2018, Potlatch acquired Deltic Timber Corp., a smaller Arkansas-based timber company. Following the merger, the company was renamed PotlatchDeltic Corporation. The merged companies owned 2 million acres of timber in total.

Properties
The forestry products that it sells are processed at seven company-owned facilities.

Spin-off of Clearwater Paper Corporation

On December 9, 2008, Clearwater Paper Corporation, previously a subsidiary of Potlatch, was created via a spin-off, with Gordon L. Jones, a vice-president of Potlatch, as the new company's president and CEO.

Shares of Clearwater Paper (NYSE:CLW) stock were distributed to Potlatch shareholders at a ratio of 1 share of Clearwater stock for every 3.5 shares of Potlatch stock held, with fractional shares paid in cash. Clearwater stock began trading on December 16, 2008.

In August 2012, since Clearwater Paper's stock had failed to rise, the company prepared to split in two and sell one or both businesses.

See also
Potlatch, Idaho

References

External links 

Companies based in Spokane, Washington
Pulp and paper companies of the United States
Forest products companies of the United States
Real estate investment trusts of the United States
Financial services companies of the United States
Companies listed on the Nasdaq